Nicolas Beer (born 5 April 1996) is a Danish racing driver.

Career

Karting
Beer began karting in 2007 and raced in many different championships for the majority of his career. He ended his karting career in 2011, moving into single-seaters.

Singe-Seaters
Beer began his single-seaters career in the Austrian Formel 1600 Cup, after this one-off appearance, he raced in Formula Ford NEZ, Formula Ford Denmark and ADAC Formel Masters. He raced a full season in the ADAC Formel Masters in 2013, ending 4th in the standings. In 2014 he raced in ATS Formel 3 Cup and BRDC Formula 4 Championship.

In March 2015 it was announced that he would make his European Formula 3 debut with EuroInternational.

Racing record

Career summary

References

External links
 

1996 births
Living people
Danish racing drivers
ADAC Formel Masters drivers
FIA Formula 3 European Championship drivers
Fluid Motorsport Development drivers
Neuhauser Racing drivers
EuroInternational drivers
Formula Lista Junior drivers
Caterham Racing drivers
Danish F4 Championship drivers